Billie Harmon Sutton (born March 16, 1984) is an American former professional bronc rider and politician. He was a member of the South Dakota Senate from 2011 to 2019, served as Minority Leader, and was the 2018 Democratic nominee for Governor of South Dakota, which he narrowly lost to Republican nominee Kristi Noem in the general election.

Early life, education, and rodeo accident
A fifth-generation South Dakotan, Sutton grew up in Burke, South Dakota, on his family ranch, where his interest in rodeo began. Sutton went to college at the University of Wyoming and became a successful rider as the university's all-time leader in rodeo points. He graduated in May 2008 with a degree in finance.

Sutton competed professionally on the PRCA circuit, reaching a top 30 worldwide ranking. In 2007, Sutton was paralyzed from the waist down when his horse flipped upside down in the chute prior to a bronc ride at a rodeo in Minot, North Dakota. He was 23 years old at the time of the accident.

After the accident and completion of his college degree, Sutton returned to Burke to work as an investment consultant at a bank.

Political career
In 2010, Sutton was elected to the South Dakota Senate, representing District 21. He served as Senate Assistant Minority Leader from 2013 to 2015. He was succeeded in this position by Troy Heinert from District 26. In 2015, Sutton became the South Dakota Senate's Minority Leader.

In May 2017, Sutton announced his candidacy for Governor of South Dakota in 2018 at his family ranch in Burke, SD. Michelle Lavallee of Sioux Falls, a former Republican, was the Lieutenant Governor candidate on Sutton's ticket. Sutton lost in the 2018 South Dakota gubernatorial election, 51.0 to 47.6 percent, in the closest gubernatorial election in South Dakota since 1986.

Endorsements
The Sioux Falls Argus Leader and Rapid City Journal endorsed Sutton for South Dakota Governor in 2018. Sutton was also endorsed by a number of prominent Republicans, including former U.S. Senator Larry Pressler, former State Senate Majority Leader Dave Knudson, former State Treasurer Dave Volk, former Mayor of Sioux Falls Rick Knobe, and current Lincoln County Commissioner Jim Schmidt, among others.

Political views
Sutton is a "pro-Second Amendment" moderate Democrat with an anti-corruption focus.

Personal life
While the accident ended Sutton's rodeo career, it did not quell his love of horse riding, an activity he still enjoys alongside his wife Kelsea. Sutton and his wife have three sons. A daughter, Lenore, was born July 8, 2020, but passed away a week later. In August 2022, a community splash pad in Burke named Lenny’s Lily Pad was opened to honor their daughter.

Electoral history

References

External links
 Official campaign website
 Biography at Ballotpedia

|-

|-

1984 births
21st-century American politicians
American politicians with disabilities
Candidates in the 2018 United States elections
Living people
People from Burke, South Dakota
Politicians with paraplegia
Democratic Party South Dakota state senators
University of Wyoming alumni